The deputy chief minister of Madhesh Province is the deputy head of the executive branch of the Government of Madhesh Province and the second highest ranking minister of the Council of Minister.

List of deputy chief ministers

See also 
Governor of Madhesh Province
Chief Minister of Madhesh Province

Reference 

Madhesh Province